Linda Strachan BEM (born 18 October 1961) is a British fencer. She competed in the women's foil events at the 1988 and 1992 Summer Olympics. In June 2015, she was awarded with the British Empire Medal in the Queen's Birthday Honours.

References

External links
 

1961 births
Living people
British female fencers
Olympic fencers of Great Britain
Fencers at the 1988 Summer Olympics
Fencers at the 1992 Summer Olympics
People from Forest Gate
Sportspeople from London